The canton of Pléneuf-Val-André is an administrative division of the Côtes-d'Armor department, northwestern France. Its borders were modified at the French canton reorganisation which came into effect in March 2015. Its seat is in Pléneuf-Val-André.

It consists of the following communes:
 
La Bouillie
Erquy
Fréhel
Hénanbihen
Lamballe-Armor (partly)
Matignon
Pléboulle
Pléneuf-Val-André
Plévenon
Plurien
Ruca
Saint-Alban
Saint-Cast-le-Guildo
Saint-Denoual
Saint-Pôtan

References

Cantons of Côtes-d'Armor